"Shoppin' from A to Z" is a song by US singer-songwriter Toni Basil, released in 1983 as the fourth and final single from her debut album Word of Mouth. It was released in the US only. After the poor performance of "Nobody" in the UK, "Shoppin' from A to Z" also failed to match the success of chart topper "Mickey", peaking at No. 77. A music video was made for the song. It was covered in a 1985 episode of Fame "Wishes. It was also covered (in Japanese) by Tomoe Shinohara. The song features a shopping list consisting of various grocery items, each beginning with a different letter of the alphabet. On the album version, it is shouted out by a chorus. The single version features comical voices saying the name of each item.

Track listing
7" single
"Shoppin' from A to Z" — 3:41
"Time After Time" — 4:18

Promo 12" "Special Remix" single
"Shoppin' from A to Z" (Special Remix) — 6:04
"Shoppin' from A to Z" — 3:41

Music video 
The music video starts with Basil and her two friends at a house looking through a shopping list and a newspaper. Then, the scene quickly changes to a supermarket where Basil and everyone in the market (including the employees) start dancing while they shop. Finally, after all that shopping, Basil and her friends arrive home exhausted. The clip ends with two dollar signs coming out of the shopping bags and plastered on a CGI heart on a green background.

References

1981 singles
Toni Basil songs
Song recordings produced by Mike Chapman
1981 songs
Chrysalis Records singles
Songs written by Allee Willis
Songs written by Bruce Roberts (singer)
Music videos directed by Toni Basil
Songs about consumerism